The following are the national records in athletics in Norfolk Island maintained by Norfolk Island's national athletics federation: Athletics Norfolk Island (ANI).

Outdoor

Men

Women

Indoor

Men

Women

# = not officially ratified

ht = hand timing

+ = en route to a longer distance

References

External links
 ANI web site

Norfolk Island
Records